Peter Martin Copping (born 1 November 1977) is an Australian film, television, theater and video game actor best known for his role as the title character in the grindhouse film  Zombie Hunter, the voice of Mozzie in Rainbow Six: Siege and a starring role as  2Lt. Lucas Riggs of the Australian Army 20th Battalion in Call of Duty: Vanguard. Copping is also known for his roles of Cpl. Richard Jennings in Forbidden Ground.

Filmography

Awards and nominations

References

External links
 
 Interview with Femail.com.au
 Interview with FilmInk Magazine

1977 births
Australian male film actors
Male actors from Melbourne
Australian male television actors
Living people